Lyndon Academy is a private international college preparatory school located in the southeast portion of Cherokee County in the Woodstock, Georgia, area near Marietta and Atlanta, in the United States. Its advanced college preparatory program is designed to educate the whole student. Starting in kindergarten, students study in multiple languages daily, advance in mathematics, engage in science projects, use technology, participate in the arts, become active citizens, participate in clubs, and compete in athletics. They perform concerts every semester.

As of the 2015–2016 school year, Lyndon Academy offers grades kindergarten through 12th grade.

Lyndon Academy is accredited by SACS-CASI, which is an accreditation division of AdvancED.

Academics 
The Lyndon Academy AdvancED accredited educational program provides a non-sectarian college preparatory curriculum based upon nationally recognized models demonstrated by New York and Massachusetts, states which routinely send a higher percentage of graduates on to college. The core academic standards in the lower school and middle school for math, English language arts and social studies are backed by the long standing curricula of New York, while the sciences are backed by Massachusetts standards. Foreign language standards, also a part of the core academics, are supported by Spain and China. Upper school courses are advanced College Board based college preparatory classes, and there are AP classes as well as college course opportunities available. Arts, athletics, technology, and an abundance of electives are available in addition to the multi-lingual core curricula.

References

External links 
 

Private elementary schools in Georgia (U.S. state)
Educational institutions established in 2005
Schools in Cherokee County, Georgia
2005 establishments in Georgia (U.S. state)